Dagenham Football Club was an English football club based in Dagenham. Established in 1949, the club played at Victoria Road from 1955 until its merger with Redbridge Forest in 1992 to form Dagenham & Redbridge.

History
Established in 1949, the club were founder members of the Metropolitan & District League in the 1949–50 season, finishing as runners-up after losing the title on goal average. They won the title the following season before becoming founder members of the Delphian League for the 1951–52 season, finishing as runners-up in the inaugural season. In 1952–53 they won the title. This was followed by two consecutive second-place finishes, before back-to-back titles were won in 1955–56 and 1956–57.

In 1957 the club switched to the Corinthian League, winning the title in their second season in the league. In 1963 they joined the Premier Division of the Athenian League. In both 1969–70 and 1970–71 they reached the final of the FA Amateur Cup, but lost on both occasions, although they did win the league in the latter season.

In 1973 the club became founder members of the new Division Two of the Isthmian League, which they won at the first attempt, earning promotion to Division One. In 1976–77 they reached the final of the FA Trophy, but lost 2–1 to Scarborough. Three years later they reached the final again, this time defeating Mossley 2–1.

In 1981 the club were admitted to the Alliance Premier League, where they remained until finishing bottom in 1987–88, when they were relegated back to the Isthmian League.

Honours
FA Trophy
Winners 1980
Isthmian League
Division Two champions 1973–74
Athenian League
Champions 1970–71
Corinthian League
Champions 1958–59
Delphian League
Champions 1952–53, 1955–56, 1956–57
 London Senior Cup
 Champions 1967-68

Records
Highest league position: Fifth in the Alliance Premier League, 1981–82
Best FA Cup performance: Third Round in 1984–85
Best FA Amateur Cup performance: Runners-up in 1969–70 and 1970–71
Best FA Trophy performance: Winners in 1979–80

Former players
1. Players that have played/managed in the Football League or any foreign equivalent to this level (i.e. fully professional league).
2. Players with full international caps.
3. Players that hold a club record.
 Stephen Wilkins
 Lee Holmes
 Roger Hoy
 David Silman

References

 
Association football clubs established in 1949
Association football clubs disestablished in 1992
Defunct football clubs in England
Dagenham & Redbridge F.C.
Defunct football clubs in London
Isthmian League
National League (English football) clubs
Metropolitan League
Delphian League
Corinthian League (football)
Athenian League
1949 establishments in England
1992 disestablishments in England
Dagenham